Doliops shavrini is a species of beetle in the family Cerambycidae. It was described by Barševskis in 2013.

References

Doliops
Beetles described in 2013